Jarl Bertil Lander (194426 May 2014) was a Swedish politician and member of the Riksdag, the national legislature. A member of the Social Democratic Party, he represented Värmland County between October 1988 and October 2006. He was also a substitute member of the Riksdag for Roine Carlsson between September 1985 and October 1988. He died on 26 May 2014 aged 70.

References

1944 births
2014 deaths
Members of the Riksdag 1988–1991
Members of the Riksdag 1991–1994
Members of the Riksdag 1994–1998
Members of the Riksdag 1998–2002
Members of the Riksdag 2002–2006
Members of the Riksdag from the Social Democrats